Yan Brice Eteki (born 26 August 1997) is a Cameroonian professional footballer who plays for as a central midfielder for Spanish club FC Cartagena, on loan from Portuguese club Casa Pia AC.

Club career
Born in Yaoundé, Eteki signed for Sevilla FC's youth setup in December 2012, from CD Leganés. He made his senior debut for the reserves on 22 February 2015, coming on as a late substitute in a 2–0 Segunda División B home win against FC Cartagena.

On 11 December 2015, Eteki renewed his contract until 2018. He made his professional debut on 21 August of the following year, starting in a 3–3 Segunda División home draw against Girona FC.

After being a regular starter during the first half of the campaign, Eteki extended his deal until 2019 on 20 January 2017. He scored his first professional goal on 16 April, netting the first in a 6–2 home routing of Real Valladolid.

On 23 August 2018, after suffering relegation, Eteki signed a two-year deal with fellow second division side UD Almería. He became a regular starter in Fran Fernández's side, contributing with 31 appearances during the campaign.

On 17 July 2019, Eteki returned to Sevilla after the club activated his €500,000 buy-back clause. The following day, he agreed to a three-year deal with Granada CF, newly promoted to La Liga.

On 19 July 2022, after Granada's relegation, Eteki signed for Primeira Liga newcomers Casa Pia AC. The following 29 January, he returned to Spain and its second division, joining FC Cartagena on loan until the end of the season, with the option to purchase should they get promoted.

International career
Eteki made his debut with the Cameroon national team in a friendly 0-0 tie with Japan on 9 October 2020.

Career statistics

Club

International

References

External links

1997 births
Living people
Footballers from Yaoundé
Cameroonian footballers
Association football midfielders
Primeira Liga players
La Liga players
Segunda División players
Segunda División B players
Sevilla Atlético players
UD Almería players
Granada CF footballers
Casa Pia A.C. players
FC Cartagena footballers
Cameroonian expatriate footballers
Cameroonian expatriate sportspeople in Spain
Cameroonian expatriate sportspeople in Portugal
Expatriate footballers in Spain
Expatriate footballers in Portugal
Cameroon international footballers